Zagrosia is a monotypic genus of bulbous flowering plants in the family Asparagaceae, subfamily Scilloideae (also treated as the family Hyacinthaceae). The sole species Zagrosia persica is found in south-east Turkey through Iraq to west Iran.

References

Monotypic Asparagaceae genera
Scilloideae